The Ministry of Education (1944-1964) was a central government department governed by the Minister of Education, with responsibility in England and Wales for:

 Promoting the education of people; 
 Developing educational institutions;
 Developing policy to provide a comprehensive educational service;
 Securing the effective execution of the education policy by local education authorities

The Ministry of Education was created by the Education Act 1944.

Scottish education was subject to the Education (Scotland) Act 1945 whereby the Scottish Office, under the Secretary of State for Scotland, undertook similar responsibilities to the Ministry of Education but for Scotland.

Northern Irish education was subject to the Education Act (Northern Ireland) 1947, passed by the Northern Ireland parliament at Stormont, which provided powers to the Minister of Education to:

 appoint members of the Northern Ireland Advisory Council for Education
 appoint  additional members of education committees for Northern Ireland local education authorities

History 

The Ministry of Education was created by the Education Act 1944 and was preceded by the Board of Education, which had been created by the Board of Education Act 1899. The Ministry of Education lasted twenty years until 1964, when it was merged with the Ministry of Science to create the Department of Education and Science.  This reorganisation followed the recommendations of the Robbins Committee on Higher Education.

Ministers 
The Minister of Education was in charge of the Ministry of Education and was in effect a corporation sole. The following members of parliament or members of the house of lords have held the office: -

Colour key (for political parties):

Parliamentary Secretaries 
The Minister of Education could appoint a Parliamentary Secretary who was the junior minister in the Ministry of Education albeit still a political appointment. The following members of parliament have held the office: -

Colour key (for political parties):

Civil Service 
The administration of the Ministry of Education was undertaken by the civil service under the leadership of the Permanent Secretary of Education.

Organisation 
The Ministry of Education was organised into branches which were constantly re-organised over the twenty years of the ministry, but the following list is of the branches which have existed at one time or another: -

Central Advisory Councils for Education 
The Education Act 1944 set-up two Central Advisory Councils for Education, one for England and one for Wales.  The Minister of Education appointed the members of each council which were mainly made-up of: -

 Senior and experienced educators in the public education system (e.g. a senior experienced & highly qualified nursery nurse)
 Scholars in the theories of learning who were often university professors

The Ministry of Education provided secretaries to the councils and funded their time, The Minister appointed the chairmen of the councils

The councils advised the minister on questions raised by the minister or issues identified by the councils

The advise was either made public through published reports or kept confidentially within the ministry

References

External links 
 A timeline of education in England

Education, Ministry of
United Kingdom
United Kingdom, Education
1944 establishments in the United Kingdom
1964 disestablishments in the United Kingdom